Below are the squads for the 2003 East Asian Football Championship tournament in Japan. There were 23 players in each squad, including three goalkeepers.

Coach:  Arie Haan

Coach:  Lai Sun Cheung

Coach:  Zico

Coach:  Humberto Coelho

External links
Official Site
East Asian Cup 2003 at Rsssf

EAFF E-1 Football Championship squads